Caroline Vis (born 4 March 1970 in Vlaardingen) is a retired professional tennis player from the Netherlands.

Vis turned pro in 1989. A doubles specialist, Vis won nine titles during her career on the WTA Tour. She reached the mixed doubles final at the 1991 French Open, playing with countryman Paul Haarhuis. Her career-high doubles ranking was No. 9 in the world, which she reached in August 1998. Vis retired in 2006.

Grand Slam mixed doubles finals

Runner-up (1)

WTA Tour finals

Doubles finals (9-17)

ITF finals

Singles (0–1)

Doubles (5-5)

External links
 
 
 

1970 births
Living people
Dutch female tennis players
People from Vlaardingen
Sportspeople from South Holland